American singer Ashlee Simpson has released three studio albums, nine singles, and nine music videos. Simpson debuted as an actress in 2001, appearing on the television series 7th Heaven. In 2003, she began composing solo material and signed a recording contract with Geffen Records in the United States.

Simpson's debut album Autobiography was released in July 2004. The album, composed of pop rock songs, reached number one on the US Billboard 200 albums chart, and was certified Platinum three times by the Recording Industry Association of America (RIAA). On the United Kingdom albums chart, it reached number thirty-one and was certified Gold by the British Phonographic Industry (BPI). The album sold three million copies in the US and produced three singles. Simpson's debut single, "Pieces of Me", reached number five on the US Billboard Hot 100 and was certified Gold by the RIAA. "La La", her third single, reached number eighty-six in the US and was certified Gold by the RIAA.

Simpson's second album, I Am Me, was released in October 2005. It debuted at number one in the US and was later certified Platinum by the RIAA. In the UK, the album reached number fifty. I Am Me sold 900,000 copies in the US and spawned two top forty singles. The album's lead single "Boyfriend", reached number eight in Australia, Simpson's second highest peak at the time, and was certified Gold by ARIA. The next single "L.O.V.E." reached number five in Australia and number twenty-two in the US. A stand-alone single released in 2006, "Invisible", reached number twenty-one in the US. Bittersweet World, Simpson's third album, was released in April 2008. The album reached number four in the US and number fifty-seven in the UK. Its singles were not successful in the US. "Little Miss Obsessive", featuring guest vocals from Tom Higgenson of Plain White T's reached number ninety-six on the Billboard Hot 100 and seventy-two in Canada. "Outta My Head (Ay Ya Ya)" failed to chart in US, but was successful in Australia, reaching the top 20 and peaking at number twenty-four in UK. In 2012, Simpson released the promotional single "Bat for a Heart" independently. In 2018, she formed a duo with husband Evan Ross and released an eponymous extended play, Ashlee + Evan, through Access Records.

Studio albums

Singles

Promotional singles

Notes

Music videos

1 The music video for "Undiscovered" is footage from the 2005 film of the same name.

Other appearances

See also
Ashlee + Evan (for a list of recordings as part of the duo with her husband Evan Ross)

References
General

"Discography". AshleeSimpsonMusic.com. Retrieved February 25, 2009.
"Releases". Interscope Records. Retrieved February 25, 2009.

Specific

External links

Discography
Simpson, Ashlee
Simpson, Ashlee